The Shenzhen Longgang Sports Center is a multifunctional sports facility in Longgang District, Shenzhen, China. The sports center consists of mainly an international tennis center and an international cycling velo-drome. The international tennis center is the venue for the ATP Shenzhen Open and WTA Shenzhen Open.

The Longgang District Works Department remodeled the sports center's basketball, badminton, and tennis facilities from January to March 2011 in preparation for the 2011 Summer Universiade,  for events not hosted at the nearby Shenzhen Universiade Sports Centre. Eleven additional tennis courts were newly constructed for use as practice venues or for semi-finals matches. The basketball and badminton courts were used as practice facilities for Universiade athletes, while the tennis courts were used both as practice facilities and as the venue for the actual competition.

The center provides no-fee entry for use of the sports facilities.

References

Longgang District, Shenzhen
Sports venues in Shenzhen